The WTA Poland Open is a tennis event located in Warsaw, Poland. The first edition of the tournament was held in July 2021 in Gdynia but in 2022 it was relocated to Warsaw.

Past finals

Singles

Doubles

References

Tennis tournaments in Poland
2021 establishments in Poland